Have It All is the eighth live album and twelfth album overall by California based Bethel Music. It was released through the group's imprint label, Bethel Music, on March 11, 2016. It was produced by Chris Greely and Bobby Strand, and mastered by Ted Jensen at Sterling Sound, NYC.

Critical reception

Matt Conner, indicating in a four star review at CCM Magazine, states, "This collection does what Bethel Music always does: connects the created to the Creator in inspirational ways on each release." Awarding the album four and a half stars from Worship Leader, Jeremy Armstrong writes, "In this collection of prayers, Have It All demonstrates a spectrum of the beauty of God...Have It All maintains the organic feel that has become Bethel's trademark and indeed their most important asset. The worship feels sincere, and the spontaneous moments add to the overall worship experience as listeners are invited to take part and join the cloud of witnesses." Mark Ryan, giving the album three and a half stars at New Release Today, states, "This album is full of truth and reflection. It is not a high energy praise-fest, but rather an album designed around the concepts of vulnerability, honesty and resilience." Rating the album four and a half stars by The Christian Beat, Madeleine Dittmer describes, "Have it All pours out praises to our Heavenly Father in songs that truly give Him all. The authentic quality in the lyrics and instrumental dynamics flow through each of the sixteen songs on the album, creating a powerful collection appropriate for all stages of life." Laura Chambers, reviewing the album for Today's Christian Entertainment, says, "Have It All is a well-rounded blend of the simple and profound, the quiet whispers and the triumphant shouts." Indicating with an 83 out of 100 rating for Jesus Wired, Rebekah Joy states, "this is a very honest album that will give listeners the chance to really reflect, and use these songs to connect with God and praise him." Philip Aldis, signaling in a four star review at Louder Than the Music, writes, "it's well made, sumptuously recorded, and all good and genuine perhaps hard to hear it’s a live album at times, only the applause at the end being the clear evidence."

Awards and accolades
In August 2016, the Gospel Music Association announced the nominees of the 47th Annual GMA Dove Awards with Have It All being nominated for a Dove Award in the Worship Album of the Year and Recorded Music Packaging of the Year categories.

Singles

On May 6, 2016, a live version of "Have It All" featuring the vocals of Brian Johnson was released as the lead single from the album on Spotify. The studio version of "Have It All" was released on May 6, 2016 as a digital download and on streaming platforms, before impacting Christian radio on May 13, 2016.

Track listing

Credits
Adapted from AllMusic.

 Eric Allen — production director 
 Cory Asbury — acoustic guitar, background vocals, lead
 Clint Aull — stage production
 Josh Baldwin — acoustic guitar, lead
 Robby Busick — production coordination
 Amanda Cook — background vocals, lead
 Chris Estes — publishing
 Steffany Gretzinger — background vocals, lead
 Kiley Goodpasture — creative director
 Chris Greely — mixing engineer, producer
 Stephen James Hart —  design, photography, visual worship leader
 Kalley Heiligenthal — lead
 Jonathan David Helser — acoustic guitar, lead
 Luke Hendrickson — keyboard
 Ted Jensen — mastering
 Brian Johnson — acoustic guitar, executive producer, lead
 Jenn Johnson — background vocals, lead
 Drake Kelch — lighting
 Andrew Kiser — bass
 William Matthews — background vocals, lead
 Hannah McClure — lead
 Paul McClure — acoustic guitar, lead
 Liam Monroe — lighting
 Casey Moore — electric guitar
 Leeland Mooring — acoustic guitar, background vocals, lead
 Matthew Ogden — bass
 Sarah Oliveira — videography
 Michael Pope — director, electric guitar
 Justin Posey — photography
 Jeremy Riddle — acoustic guitar, lead
 Bobby Strand — electric guitar, producer
 Lindsey Strand — background vocals, lead, project manager
 Joel Taylor — executive producer
 Jonah Thompson — monito engineer
 Rebekah Van Tinteren — strings
 Joe Volk — background vocals, drums, percussion
 Ally Whitworth — production coordinator
 David Whitworth — drums, percussion
 Allison Wyatt — strings

Charts

Weekly charts

Year-end charts

Certifications and sales

Release history

References

2016 albums
Bethel Music albums